Below is a list of museums in Sierra Leone.

List
 Sierra Leone National Museum
 Sierra Leone Peace Museum
 Sierra Leone National Railway Museum

See also
 List of museums

External links
 Museums in Sierra Leone

Sierra Leone
Museums
Sierra Leone
Museums